Dəryavar (also, Deryavar, Der’yavar, and Dar’yavar) is a village and municipality in the Yardymli Rayon of Azerbaijan.  It has a population of 300.

References 

Populated places in Yardimli District